St. Paul's Lutheran Church, Parsonage and Cemetery is a historic Lutheran church, parsonage, and cemetery in Wurtemberg in Dutchess County, New York.

The church was built about 1802, enlarged in 1832, and remodeled in 1861.  It is a large, two-story rectangular frame building with a gable roof and prominent central tower.  It is in the Federal style.  The parsonage was built about 1870 and is a two-story, center-hall frame building in the Italianate style. The cemetery has burials dating from the 18th and 19th centuries.  Also on the property are two sheds.

It was added to the National Register of Historic Places in 1987.

Gallery

References

External links
 Official Website
 
 

Lutheran churches in New York (state)
Churches on the National Register of Historic Places in New York (state)
Federal architecture in New York (state)
Cemeteries on the National Register of Historic Places in New York (state)
Churches in Dutchess County, New York
Cemeteries in Dutchess County, New York
Churches completed in 1802
19th-century Lutheran churches in the United States
National Register of Historic Places in Dutchess County, New York
Lutheran cemeteries in the United States
Religious organizations established in 1760
1760s establishments in the Province of New York